The 2014–15 Marquette Golden Eagles women's basketball team represented Marquette University in the 2014–15 college basketball season. The Golden Eagles were led by 1st year head coach Carolyn Kieger and were members of the Big East Conference. The Golden Eagles will play their home games at the Al McGuire Center. They finished the season 9–22, 4–14 in Big East play to finish in eighth place. They advanced to the quarterfinals of the Big East women's tournament where they lost to Seton Hall.

2014–15 Roster

Schedule

|-
!colspan=9 style="background:#00386D; color:#FDBB30;"|Exhibition

|-
!colspan=9 style="background:#FDBB30; color:#00386D;"| Regular Season

|-
!colspan=9 style="background:#00386D;"| 2015 Big East tournament

References

Marquette
Marquette Golden Eagles women's basketball seasons
Marquette
Marquette